Dario Bottaro (born 5 November 1966) is an Italian former professional racing cyclist. He rode in three editions of the Tour de France, three editions of the Giro d'Italia and one edition of the Vuelta a España.

Major results

1987
 1st Giro del Medio Brenta
1988
 3rd Giro del Medio Brenta
 3rd Gran Premio Palio del Recioto
1989
 1st Trofeo Città di San Vendemiano
 3rd Gran Premio Sportivi di Poggiana
1992
 1st Stage 8 Grand Prix Guillaume Tell
 3rd New Jersey Classic
 8th Giro dell'Emilia
1993
 3rd Tour of Flanders
 8th Giro dell'Emilia
1994
 3rd Overall Ronde van Nederland
1st Stage 3b
 3rd First Union Invitational
1995
 1st Stage 3 Tour de France (TTT)

References

External links
 

1966 births
Living people
Italian male cyclists
Cyclists from the Province of Padua